Life After Death is the ninth studio album by American singer TobyMac, released on August 19, 2022, on ForeFront Records. It is his sixth album to top the Billboard Christian Albums chart. The album's lead single, "Help Is On the Way (Maybe Midnight)", peaked at number three on the Hot Christian Songs chart.

Background 
TobyMac claimed that this was his most emotional album that he ever recorded. In October 2019, his eldest son Truett died after an accidental drug overdose. TobyMac said, "I immediately went to write, because that's what I know to do when I'm in so much pain. You go to [write] what you know, what you love and what brings you peace. I immediately started writing – and I wrote '21 Years'. Then I wrote a song called 'Faithfully', and I wrote 'Everything About You' in the first few months after Truett passed."

Singles 
"21 Years" was released on January 9, 2020, and is about TobyMac's son who died a couple months prior, at the age of 21. The song peaked at number three on the US Hot Christian Songs Chart.

"I'm Sorry (A Lament)" was released on March 10, 2020. The song peaked at number 25 on the US Hot Christian Songs Chart.

"Help Is On the Way (Maybe Midnight)" was released on February 19, 2021. The song peaked at number three on the US Hot Christian Songs Chart.

"Promised Land" was released on September 17, 2021. The song peaked at number nine on the US Hot Christian Songs Chart. The song featured pop rock artist Sheryl Crow on the OG Collab version.

"The Goodness" was released on June 2, 2022. The song featured new artist Blessing Offor, and peaked at number one on the US Hot Christian Songs Chart. This song was then performed at the 53rd GMA Dove Awards.

"Cornerstone" was released on February 17, 2023. The song featured CCM artist Zach Williams.

Critical reception

Life After Death received mostly positive ratings from critics. Jesus Freak Hideout said of the album, " With a lyrical cohesion and an almost theatrical community feel throughout, Life After Death is a tough album (if you understand the sad context of it) that nevertheless gives hope...is well worth your time, and shows that in Christ, believers 'do not weep as those who have no hope.' Tragedy is not the end of the story." Giving the album a perfect 5, 365 Days of Inspiring Media said that the album was “very powerful, heartfelt, compelling, and challenging, while also laced in the joyfulness colliding with lament and sorrow that comes after a death of a loved one. It’s knowing the promise of God while still reconciling how it looks like, this side of eternity. And that is what is seen all through Toby’s album, and it’s been a blast to listen to it." AllMusic's Marcy Donelson rated the album 4 out of 5, stating that "[TobyMac's] eventual ninth album, Life After Death, finds the genre-blurring Christian artist navigating the aftermath [of his son's death] alongside a slew of guests with a poignant mix of warm appreciations and invigorated motivational song." JubileeCast gave 4 out of 5 and said, "Though not perfect, the album does have many powerful moments. Most importantly, this is an honest set of songs. TobyMac doesn't give us recycled answers to the problem of suffering. Rather, using the space of 15 songs, he works with us through these issues. Reflective of life, there are some downers as well as some sparks of joy and hope." New Release Today's Average NRTeam rating was 2 out of 5.

Accolades

Commercial performance 
The album peaked at No. 34 on the Billboard 200 and No. 1 on the Christian Albums chart.

Track listing

Album credits
Credits adapted from liner notes.

 TobyMac - songwriting, vocals, production
 Bryan Fowler - production on tracks 2, 6, 7, 9, 11, & 13, engineering, guitar, bass, background vocals on tracks 2, 6, 7, 9, & 11
 Dave Lubben - production on tracks 10, 12 & 15, percussion, guitar, engineering, keyboards, strings, acoustic guitar, background vocals on tracks 10 & 12
 Jon Reddick - production on track 4, guest vocals on track 4, background vocals on tracks 1, 4 & 5, keyboards
 Micah Kuiper - production on tracks 1, 3, 4, 5, 7, 8, 9, & 11, engineering, programming, guitar, bass, keyboards, drums, background vocals on tracks 1, 7, 9, & 11
 Tommee Proffitt - production on track 14, instrumentation
 Kyle Williams - production on tracks 2, 6, & 8, background vocals on tracks 2, 6 & 8, guitar
 Cole Walowac - production on track 7
 Serban Ghenea - mixing
 Nick Rad - mixing
 Bob Boyd - mastering
 Doug Sarrett - mastering, engineering
 Chris Gehringer - mastering
 Reske - co-production on track 7
 Zach Williams - guest vocals on track 9
 Blessing Offor - guest vocals on track 2, background vocals on track 4
 Gabe Real - guest vocals on track 15, background vocals on tracks 1, 2, 4 & 5
 Terrian - guest vocals on tracks 10 & 15
 Wande - guest vocals on track 10
 Marlee McKeehan - guest vocals on track 6
 Tauren Wells - guest vocals on track 3
 Sarah Reeves - guest vocals on track 7
 Sheryl Crow - guest vocals on track 5
 Michael Tait - guest vocals on track 12
 Kevin Max - guest vocals on track 12
 Cory Asbury - guest vocals on track 11
 Lydi Lynn - piano, background vocals on track 10
 Tony Lucido - bass 
 Sterloid - drums
 Terence F. Clark - drums
 Aaron Sterling - drums
 Paul Mabury - drums
 Tim Rosenau - guitar
 Scott Mills - guitar 
 Tyler Summers - baritone saxophone, tenor saxophone
 Jeff Bailey - trumpet
 Keith Everette Smith - trumpet, string arrangement, horn arrangement, brass arrangement
 Steve Patrick - trumpet
 Barry Green - trombone 
 Bob McChesney - trombone 
 Raymond Mason - trombone
 Anna Spina - French horn
 Jennifer Kummer - French horn
 David Gerald Sutton - strings
 Betsy Lamb - viola 
 Kristin Wilkinson - viola
 Carolyn Bailey - violin
 David Angell - violin
 David Davidson - violin
 Janet Darnall - violin
 Jenny Bifano - violin
 Karen Winklemann - violin
 Anthony LaMarchina - cello
 Sari Reist - cello
 Janice Gaines - background vocals on track 4
 Andrew Thompson - background vocals on track 5
 Tasha Smith - background vocals on track 5
 Debi Selby - choir on track 14
 Emoni Wilkins - background vocals on track 5, choir on track 14
 Jason Eskridge - choir on track 14
 Moiba Mustapha - choir on track 14
 Nickie Conley - choir on track 14
 Travis Cottrell - choir on track 14
 Ryan Stevenson - background vocals on track 2
 Michael Cochren - background vocals on track 1

Charts

Weekly charts

Year-end charts

References 

2022 albums
ForeFront Records albums
TobyMac albums